Cissna is a surname. Notable people with the surname include:

L. Francis Cissna (born 1966), American lawyer and government official
Sharon Cissna (born 1942), American politician

See also
Cissna Park, Illinois